The 2020 Nevada Senate election was held on Tuesday, November 3, 2020. Voters in 10 districts of the Nevada Senate elected senators. The elections coincided with the elections for other offices, including for U.S. President, U.S. House and the Nevada Assembly. Republicans needed to gain three seats to win control of the chamber.

The primary elections were held on June 9, 2020.

Background 
In the 2018 Nevada State Senate election, Democrats maintained control of the Nevada Senate by a 13–8 margin. Democrats have controlled the chamber since 2016.

Predictions

Results

Overview

Close races
Seats where the margin of victory was under 10%:

Results by District

District 1

District 3

District 4

District 5

District 6

District 7

District 11

District 15

District 18

District 19

See also
 2020 Nevada elections

References

External links
 
 
  (State affiliate of the U.S. League of Women Voters)
 

State Senate
Nevada Senate
Nevada Senate elections